St. Stephan's Church is a historic church on Ferry Street and Wilson Avenue in the Ironbound section of Newark, Essex County, New Jersey, United States.

It was built in 1874 and added to the National Register of Historic Places in 1972. This was also the site of the alien ship rising up from beneath the street in the 2005 film, War of the Worlds. The recreated church front facing onto Merchant Street was mechanically designed to shear off and move as the earth shook before the alien craft emerged.

See also
 National Register of Historic Places listings in Essex County, New Jersey

References

Churches in Newark, New Jersey
Churches on the National Register of Historic Places in New Jersey
Churches completed in 1874
19th-century United Church of Christ church buildings
National Register of Historic Places in Newark, New Jersey
New Jersey Register of Historic Places